The MV Dolores Chouest is a specifically built surrogate ship, to DSV Alvin class submersibles and other military rescue ships. She provides surface support for special warfare exercise missions, submarine sea trials/deep dives, mine recovery operations (inert mines only) and unmanned vehicle operations and mother ship support for submarine rescue chamber operations. The contract was valued at $19.9 million for four years if all options are exercised. The Dolores Chouest is based in Joint Expeditionary Base Little Creek–Fort Story, Virginia to help support emergency roles in the Atlantic ocean. These ships serve emergency needs in the case that a submarine experiences catastrophic failure while underway. These ships are also used for scientific surveys and have been used in various salvage operations. The Dolores Chouest can support all the submersibles and divers while other cargo craft are nearby to transfer raised goods.

References
 Ship inventory Military Sealift Command
 Ship mentioned in anaual report Military Sealift Command
 Overview of type of ships Globalsecurity.org

Ships built in Louisiana
2006 ships